Moussa Benhamadi (4 January 1953 – 17 July 2020) was an Algerian politician and researcher. He was a member of the National Liberation Front (FLN).

Biography
Benhamadi commenced his career as a computer engineer and researcher in information systems and networks. In 1985, he founded the Centre de recherche sur l'information scientifique et technique, which became the first internet provider of Algeria in 1993. He headed the center until 2002, when he was elected into the People's National Assembly, representing Bordj Bou Arréridj. In 2008, Benhamadi became CEO of Algérie Télécom, a position he held for two years. From 2010 to 2012, he served as Minister of Communication. His brother, Abderrahmane, directed Groupe Benhamadi Antar Trade-Condor, the family's telecommunications company.

Benhamadi was arrested during the 2019 protests on 18 September. He died from COVID-19 in Bordj Bou Arréridj on 17 July 2020, at the age of 67, during the COVID-19 pandemic in Algeria

References

People from Bordj Bou Arréridj Province
National Liberation Front (Algeria) politicians
1953 births
2020 deaths
Deaths from the COVID-19 pandemic in Algeria
21st-century Algerian people